Israel David Martinez (March 3, 1969) Spanish video game composer born and living in Barcelona.

References 

External links

External links 
 Israel David Martínez official site
 Ferrer-Salat Music Foundation Prize:1993: Israel David Martínez “La jeune martyre”
 The disintegration of self, 1st movement: the anxiety
 The disintegration of self, 2nd movement: the hell
 The disintegration of self, 3rd movement: the memory

1969 births
Living people
Spanish composers
Spanish male composers
Musicians from Barcelona